A statue of Elizabeth II by Leo Mol was installed in Winnipeg, Manitoba, Canada.

Description

History
Leo Mol completed the statue in 1970. The sculpture was originally installed in the Steinkopf Gardens at the Centennial Concert Hall, in downtown Winnipeg.

Although Mol had most of his bronze works cast in Germany, he did also perform some of his castings himself, in his studio. “Among the many casts done there was a giant nine foot figure of Queen Elizabeth for the City of Winnipeg – an astonishing achievement for a homemade foundry.”

In July 2010, Elizabeth II visited Winnipeg to rededicate the statue, which was relocated to the Government House grounds. The Duke of Edinburgh also attended the dedication ceremony.

The sculpture, along with another depicting Queen Victoria, was toppled on Canada Day, 1 July 2021, following the Canadian Indian residential schools gravesite discoveries.  The statue of Elizabeth II was brought down by and left covered in yellow rope, as well as covered in red paint. Although both queens were constitutional monarchs, meaning they did not make policy or law and were bound to follow the advice and direction of their ministers and parliamentarians, and Canada had ceased to be a colony of Britain in 1931, meaning Elizabeth II reigned in Canada distinctly as Queen of Canada, the protesters who tore the statues down were said to have beleived Elizabeth and Victoria represented Canada's colonial history.

As of July 2022, the statue of Elizabeth II is being restored and will be put back in place while the statue of Queen Victoria was damaged beyond repair and will not be replaced.

See also

 1970 in art
 Royal monuments in Canada

References

External links
 Historic Sites of Manitoba: Queen Elizabeth II Statue (Kennedy Street, Winnipeg), Manitoba Historical Society
 , The Independent

1970 sculptures
Bronze sculptures in Canada
Buildings and structures in Winnipeg
Monuments and memorials in Manitoba
Monuments and memorials to Queen Elizabeth II
Outdoor sculptures in Canada
Royal monuments in Canada
Sculptures of women in Canada
Statues in Canada
Statues of Elizabeth II
Statues removed in 2021
Vandalized works of art in Canada